Marc Ford (born April 13, 1966) is an American blues-rock guitarist. He is a former lead guitarist of the rock and roll band The Black Crowes, the former lead guitarist of The Magpie Salute and the leader of his own bands: Burning Tree, Marc Ford & The Neptune Blues Club, Jefferson Steelflex, Fuzz Machine and Marc Ford & The Sinners.

History

Early life
Ford was born in Long Beach, California, United States.

Burning Tree
Ford started out playing the Southern California/Los Angeles underground rock scene in the early/mid-eighties in bands such as Citadel, which later went by the names Citadel Ltd & Head. He also played guitar on the self-titled 1984 EP by Jack Grisham's post-T.S.O.L. band Cathedral of Tears, on which he is credited as "Mark Ford". He played in the L.A. side-project band Stronzo which featured Mickey Finn of Jetboy, Sami Yaffa of Hanoi Rocks/Jetboy, and various other musicians playing shows outside of their main bands, and in 1988 Ford played guitar for Michael Monroe at the Scream club, also with Sami Yaffa on bass, which was the first ever L.A. show for the former Hanoi Rocks singer. Ford also played with early Dogs D’Amour/L.A. Guns man Robert Stoddard, and around this time was in Orange County band The Scarecrows.

In the late eighties, Citadel Ltd/Head evolved into the blues-rock outfit Burning Tree, a power trio featuring Ford on guitars and vocals, Mark Dutton on bass and vocals, and Doni Gray on drums and vocals. Burning Tree released their self-titled debut album on Epic Records in 1990. A commercial failure but a critical success, Burning Tree allowed the group to tour extensively throughout most of 1990 and 1991. The band's career was cut short when Ford left to join the Black Crowes, for whom Burning Tree had opened on their first (and only) tour.

The Black Crowes
In mid-1991, Marc Ford sat in a couple of times with the Black Crowes in concert, performing The Allman Brothers Band's classic hit, "Dreams".

When the Black Crowes severed their relationship with their original guitarist Jeff Cease, Ford was asked to fill the vacancy. He accepted the offer, and a few days later was asked by Slash to join Guns N' Roses. Ford refused. At the time, Guns N' Roses were in the middle of a huge stadium world tour. Ford said in 2017 that he would probably be dead now, had he joined them.

Ford stepped into the Crowes' lineup to record their 1992 sophomore album, The Southern Harmony and Musical Companion. The album reached Number 1 on the Billboard charts and earned a double platinum certificate for sales. Ford performed on the next two Black Crowes releases, Amorica (1994) and Three Snakes and One Charm (1996), and is also credited for tracks from the band's two unreleased albums (1993's Tall and 1997's Band, later released together as The Lost Crowes). His addition to the Black Crowes sound, which consisted primarily of slide guitar and southern twang, helped define the band at the time. Ford's ability to adapt to core songwriter Rich Robinson's music and crunchy rhythm guitar sound solidified him and Robinson as the preeminent guitar duo of the 1990s.

During his time in the Black Crowes Ford also played slide guitar on British band Thee Hypnotics' 1994 album The Very Crystal Speed Machine, produced by Chris Robinson.

Ford was dismissed from the Black Crowes in late 1997, following the band's stint on the summer-long Furthur Festival tour. Black Crowes leaders Chris and Rich Robinson cited Ford's excessive drug use as the reason for his firing, a reason that was confirmed by the guitarist entering a rehab facility soon after his dismissal.

Solo and collaborations
After his departure from the Black Crowes, Ford formed Marc Ford and the Uninvited. In 1998, he sat in numerous times with Gov't Mule before joining the Chris Stills Band for a summer tour. Upon the conclusion of that tour, Ford quit the Chris Stills Band to form Federale, a joint venture between himself and Luther Russell (who were eventually joined by drummer Jimi Bott and bassist Freddy Trujillo). The band gained attention from major label Interscope Records. Federale toured briefly, opening for acts like Gov't Mule, but disbanded after Interscope Records was bought out by Universal Music Group.

During 2000, Ford joined the Pink Floyd/blues jam/tribute band Blue Floyd, which originally featured Allen Woody (guitar, bass), Matt Abts (drums), Johnny Neel (keyboards) and Berry Oakley Jr. (bass). Ford left Blue Floyd at the close of 2001, opting to again to go solo. In January 2002, Malibu, California, Ford performed a set with Chris Robinson, the first time Ford and Robinson had performed with one another since Ford's dismissal from the Black Crowes nearly five years prior. Robinson again joined Ford at the Malibu Inn two weeks later, confirming that they had made amends. Ford co-wrote "Sunday Sound," a track featured on Robinson's solo debut, New Earth Mud.

Following his acoustic-based stint at the Malibu Inn, Ford decided to form a full-fledged electric band. Featuring fellow Blue Floyd member Berry Oakley Jr. (bass) and newcomers Gootch (drums) and Chris Joyner (keys), Marc Ford and The Sinners hit the road in early 2002. During the tour, Ford often took time out (with and without The Sinners) to record tracks for his debut effort entitled It's About Time, which was released on Anko Records in the fall of 2002.

In 2003, Marc Ford and The Sinners had an opening slot on Lucinda Williams' ongoing tour. Later that year, Ford accepted an invitation to join Ben Harper and the Innocent Criminals, relegating The Sinners to an indefinite hiatus. Ford toured with Ben Harper and the Innocent Criminals for the majority of 2003, from which their live EP Live at the Hollywood Bowl was drawn. Ford continued his association with Ben Harper and his band through the close of 2004, featuring on Harper's collaboration with The Blind Boys of Alabama, There Will Be a Light, when he was called to rejoin The Black Crowes for their "All Join Hands" reunion run.

Black Crowes reunion
After a three-year hiatus, the Robinson brothers reformed the Black Crowes in early 2005 for a series of gigs and (later) a new album. In March 2005, it was announced that Marc Ford would be returning to the lead guitar spot. Ford never severed his ties with Harper, however, appearing on his 2006 album Both Sides of the Gun and performing a handful of shows in support while an active member of The Black Crowes.

Ford toured with the Black Crowes through the summer of 2006. Despite some new songs being debuted during live performances, no new studio material was released. On September 5, 2006, two days before he was due to hit the road for the fall leg of the ongoing Black Crowes reunion tour, Ford's lawyer notified the Black Crowes management via fax that, effective immediately, the guitarist would no longer be a member of the band. The following day, Ford put out a press release announcing that he had left the Crowes to protect his hard-fought sobriety, and that he had recently produced albums for emerging artists the Pawnshop Kings and Ryan Bingham.

Ford confirmed in a November 2006 interview with Hittin' the Note magazine that he is contractually prohibited from discussing his time in the Black Crowes during the period of 2005–2006. In a later interview with the magazine, Ford revealed that this contractual limitation was "in perpetuity."

Solo again
Shortly after his sudden departure from the Black Crowes, Ford reunited with his Burning Tree bandmates for three gigs at the King King in Hollywood, California. Following the impromptu dates, Ford enlisted Doni Gray as his bandmate, along with Muddy and his son Elijah Ford, for a new studio album he had begun preproduction on. Touted by the guitarist as a more guitar-based recording, Weary and Wired was released on March 13, 2007, on Shrapnel Records' subdivision Blues Bureau. Coinciding with the release of Weary and Wired was Ford's feature interview on the cover of jam-band oriented music magazine Hittin' the Note (Issue #52).

Throughout 2007 Ford hit the road in support of his new album, with bandmates Mark "Muddy" Dutton, Elijah Ford and new drummer Dennis Morehouse. The tour found the band performing across the United States, as well as select dates in Spain, Germany, Russia and at a handful of European festivals. During later dates on the tour, Ford unveiled as many as six new songs, hinting at another album on the way. The tour continued through the end of 2007, when Ford took a short break.

Early in 2008, Ford played sporadic shows on the West Coast, some with his Fuzz Machine band and some with a new venture, Jefferson Steelflex. Ford and his son Elijah joined Ryan Bingham for several dates on his tour, performing songs from the Ford-produced album Mescalito. Ford played slide guitar on Bingham's appearances on The Tonight Show and Late Night with Conan O'Brien in the summer of 2008.

Ford produced Steepwater Band's next studio effort, an LP tentatively titled Grace & Melody released in November 2008, at Compound Studios in Signal Hill, California (recording began in the first week of May 2008). Ford first met the Chicago-based power trio when their bands shared a festival bill in Bilbao, Spain (in the summer of 2007). Ford joined the band on stage to jam on a pair of songs including a cover of Neil Young's "Cortez the Killer", following a sit-in by his bandmate/son Elijah. Steepwater Band subsequently provided support for Ford's headlining gig at the Double Door in Chicago on July 26, 2007; this time Jeff Massey and Tod Bowers (of Steepwater Band) joined Ford's band for their encore. Soon after, Ford approached the trio about producing their next effort.

In early August 2008, it was announced (via his record label) that Ford's new record would be available online and in stores on September 23, 2008. Entitled Marc Ford and the Neptune Blues Club, the record features entirely new material performed by the newest incarnation of Ford's band the Neptune Blues Club (himself on guitars and vocals, Mike Malone on keyboards and vocals, Anthony Arvizu on drums, Bill Barrett on harmonica and John Bazz on upright bass). This latest version of his band is a slight reconfiguration of the Jefferson Steelflex band, which had performed earlier in the year prior to Ford's short stint with Ryan Bingham.

During the latter part of 2008, Ford took up playing lead guitar at the Vineyard Community Church in Laguna Niguel, California. Via that gig, He produced and contributed guitar work to Vineyard Music artist Chris Lizotte's album, Signal Hill Revival, released in early 2009. Ford's association with both the church and Lizotte continues to the present day.

In early 2009, it was rumored that the Neptune Blues Club was working on its second record at Compound Studios. However, Ford's deal with Shrapnel Records' subsidiary Blues Bureau had expired after 2008's Neptune Blues Club, and by mid-2009 it seemed that the Neptune Blues Club had expired with it. One sole track from the sessions, "Shalomar Dreams," was released via online distributor BandCamp.com; it remains the only material released from the second album sessions to date.

In May 2009, it was revealed that Ford would be joining the touring band for blues artist Booker T. Jones (of Booker T. & the MG's fame). Ford was confirmed as the guitarist for June through September 2009.

In the fall of 2009, Ford launched a download site to showcase and facilitate the sale of his archive of soundboard recordings from his solo work. The shows released thus far focus entirely on the Neptune Blues Club. It is unclear if the site will cover other eras of Ford's solo career.

In February 2010, Ford released his fourth studio album, Fuzz Machine, featuring material recorded while on a touring break in the fall of 2007 with the band of the same name. The album's release coincided with Ford's mini-tour of Spain, on which he used the Steepwater Band as his backing band. The tour prompted the launch of a new website for Ford, the central theme of which is based around the Fuzz Machine recording. The album was exclusively available at all of Ford's performances on the mini-tour, followed by online distribution in November.

After producing Phantom Limb's The Pines album, Ford asked the band to return the favor by backing his own solo project. He signed with the Naim record label in the UK to release his next album, Holy Ghost on April 14, 2014. He announced the new album in Country Music magazine.

In 2015, Ford played on his friend, singer songwriter Craig Helmreich's, record (It's Just Craig's Blood On the Table) which was recorded with John Vanderslice at Tiny Telephone in San Francisco.  Ford and Vanderslice hit it off, and in early 2016, Ford returned to Tiny Telephone to record his latest, The Vulture, released in 2016.

On May 18, 2018, Marc Ford played his first full solo acoustic show at the Thunder Road Club. This was a benefit show to raise money for a local food pantry and the Ayer Masonic Association. An unreleased "The Magpie Salute" song, "Lost Boy", was played for the first time (as an encore). "Lost Boy" is expected to be released in Oct 2019, on The Magpie Salute's High Water II LP/CD.

June 29, 2018, Marc Ford and Rich Robinson played a private, acoustic, concert in Old Lyme CT.

The Magpie Salute
In late 2016, it was announced that Marc Ford had joined the newly formed the Magpie Salute, led by his former Black Crowes bandmate Rich Robinson.

August 10, 2018: The Magpie Salute's debut studio album, High Water I, was released on Eagle Rock (North America), Mascot Label Group (Europe, Australia, New Zealand) and Sony (Japan).

September 6, 2019: The Magpie Salute – High Water II was released (Eagle Rock Entertainment 2019)

On November 11, 2019, it was announced that Rich and Chris Robinson reformed the Black Crowes with all new band members and TMS went on "hiatus".

Next Chapter
On November 2, 2019: The Marc Ford Band (Marc Ford/Elijah Ford/Phil Jones) performed at the second annual benefit concert for patch outreach (Massachusetts based food pantry) and the Ayer Masonic Association.

January 2020 – a west coast tour opening for Allman Betts Band and a west coast headline tour was announced.

On March 8, 2020, The Allman Betts Band performed at the Palace Theatre in Los Angeles which was  highlighted by a series of exciting sit-ins. Marc joined The Doors’ Robby Krieger and the ABB to play "Trouble No More" and "Roadhouse Blues" 

March 12, 2020, The ABB tour was canceled March 12 after only 2 shows. A few weeks later Marc’s 2020 headline tour was also canceled due to the COVID-19 pandemic.

September 29, 2021, the ABB tour resumed with Marc Ford as the opening band. Joining Marc on drums was Phil Jones and Berry Duane Oakley played bass

Discography

Solo
It's About Time (Anko Records, 2003)
Weary and Wired (Blues Bureau, 2007)
Marc Ford and the Neptune Blues Club (Blues Bureau, 2008)
Fuzz Machine (BandCamp, an online-exclusive release, 2020)
Holy Ghost (Naim Label, 2014)
The Vulture (2016)
St. James Infirmary b/w Backwater Blues (single, Need To Know, 2018)
Fuzz Machine (Self-released on vinyl and CD 2020)

With the Scarecrows
 The Scarecrows – The Scarecrows featuring Marc Ford (Manic Records, rec. 1988; released 2005)

With Burning Tree
 Burning Tree (Epic Records, 1990)

With the Black Crowes
 The Black Crowes – The Southern Harmony and Musical Companion (American Recordings, 1992)
 The Black Crowes – Amorica (American Recordings, 1994)
 The Black Crowes – Three Snakes and One Charm (American Recordings, 1996)
The Lost Crowes (Rhino, 2006), containing the previously unreleased studio albums
Tall (1993)
Band (1997)
Freak 'n' Roll...Into the Fog (CD/DVD) with the Black Crowes (Eagle Vision, 2006)

With Ben Harper
 Ben Harper and the Innocent Criminals – Live at the Hollywood Bowl EP (Virgin Records, 2003)
 Ben Harper and the Innocent Criminals – Live at the Hollywood Bowl (DVD; Virgin Records, 2003)
 Ben Harper and the Blind Boys of Alabama –  There Will Be a Light (Virgin Records, 2004)
 Ben Harper and the Blind Boys of Alabama – Live at the Apollo (Ben Harper and The Blind Boys of Alabama) (Virgin Records, 2004)
 Ben Harper and the Blind Boys Of Alabama – Live at the Apollo (DVD) (Virgin Records 2004)
Both Sides of the Gun (Virgin Records, 2006)

With The Magpie Salute
 The Magpie Salute – Live (Eagle Rock Entertainment 2017)
 The Magpie Salute – High Water I (Eagle Rock Entertainment 2018)
 The Magpie Salute – The Killing Moon (Eagle Rock Entertainment 2019)
 The Magpie Salute – In Here EP (Eagle Rock Entertainment 2019)
 The Magpie Salute – High Water II (Eagle Rock Entertainment 2019)

Collaborations and tributes
 Izzy Stradlin and the Ju Ju Hounds – Izzy Stradlin and the Ju Ju Hounds (Geffen Records, 1992)
 Thee Hypnotics – The Very Crystal Speed Machine (American Recordings, 1994)
 The Original Harmony Ridge Creekdippers – Pacific Coast Rambler (Creek Dippers, 1998)
 Gov't Mule – Live... With a Little Help from Our Friends (Capricorn Records, 1999)
 Scott Thomas  – Lovers and Thieves (Halfpipe Records, 2003)
 Songs From the Material World: A Tribute to George Harrison (Koch Records, 2003)
 Ariel Belont – Let's Rock (Dreamland Music, 2007)
 Ryan Delmore – The Spirit, the Water, and the Blood (Varietal Records, 2008)
 Mark Riley – Capture My Heart and Simply Come (Music Missions International Kaua`i, 2014) 
 It's Just Craig (Craig Helmreich) – Blood On the Table (MRL Indiana, LLC., 2015)
 It's Just Craig (Craig Helmreich) – Dark Corners (MRL Indiana, LLC., 2017)
 Jim Wilson and Phil Jones – "Now Playing" (SWINGIN' PIPE RECORDS 2018) 
 Mark Morton – Anesthetic (ANESTHETIC ) ( A Spinefarm Records/WPP Records release; 2019 WPP Records, under exclusive license to Universal Music Operations Limited  2019 WPP Records)
 JB Strauss – Piss Ant Hill JB Strauss, 'Piss Ant Hill' [Exclusive Premiere]

As a producer
 PawnShop Kings – Locksley (Owen Brothers Publishing, 2007)
 Ryan Bingham – Mescalito (Lost Highway, 2007)
 Steepwater Band – Grace and Melody (Diamond Day Records, 2008)
 Chris Lizotte – Signal Hill Revival (Varietal Records, 2008)
 Ryan Bingham – Road House Sun (Lost Highway, 2009)
 Jonny Burke – Distance and Fortune (Bandcamp, 2011)
 Phantom Limb – The Pines (2012)
 Republique du Salem – Republique du Salem (2015)

References

External links
Ford's official website
Ford official download website
Ford's MySpace
Archived set lists of Ford's live performances

20th-century American guitarists
The Black Crowes members
1966 births
Living people
American rock musicians
American rock guitarists
American male guitarists
Guitarists from Los Angeles
Provogue Records artists